John 20:20 is the twentieth verse of the twentieth chapter of the Gospel of John in the New Testament. It contains the reaction the disciples to Jesus' first appearance after his resurrection and Jesus showing his hands and his side.

Content
The original Koine Greek, according to the Textus Receptus, reads:

In the King James Version of the Bible it is translated as:
And when he had so said, he shewed unto them his hands and his side. Then were the disciples glad, when they saw the Lord.

The modern World English Bible translates the passage as:
When he had said this, he showed them his hands and his side. The disciples therefore were glad when they saw the Lord.

For a collection of other versions see BibleHub John 20:20

Textual witnesses
Some early manuscripts containing the text of this verse in Greek are:
Papyrus 5
Codex Vaticanus (AD 325–350)
Codex Sinaiticus (330-360)
Codex Bezae (c. 400)
Codex Alexandrinus (400-440)

Analysis
The account of Jesus' first appearance in the Gospel of John (20:19-23) shows similarity to the account in the Gospel of Luke, that it happened in Jerusalem in the evening of his resurrection from the dead. 

"His hands and his side" are to identify the marks of crucifixion ( adds his feet); Jesus' hands had been nailed to the cross and his side pierced. The identification, together with the greeting caused the rapid switch of the disciples' emotion from "fear" (verse 19) to "joy"/"glad" (verse 20).

References

Sources

External links
Jesus Appears to His Disciples

20:20
John 20:20